Grandon may refer to:

People 
Surname
 Francis J. Grandon, (1879–1929), American silent film actor and director
 Jeanne-Marie Grandon (1746–1807), French painter

 Given name
 Grandon Rhodes (1904–1987), American actor

Other uses 
 Grandon, Hadley Green, a listed building in London
 The Grandon Company, an imprint of Donald M. Grant, Publisher